Scariola is a genus of Asian plants in the dandelion tribe within the daisy family.

 Species
 Scariola albertoregalia  (C.Winkl.) Kirp. - Uzbekistan, Tajikistan, Kyrgyzstan 
 Scariola amaurophyton Podlech & Rech.f. - Afghanistan
 Scariola exigua Tuisl - Afghanistan

 formerly included
several species now considered members of Lactuca

References

Asteraceae genera
Cichorieae